The 2006 World University Cycling Championship is the 4th Word University Cycling Championship sponsored by the International University Sports Federation (FISU) and sanctioned by the Union Cycliste Internationale (UCI). Cycling made his comeback after a 16-year absence as a university sport. The championship took place in Antwerp (for the road race events) and Herentals (for the cyclo-cross event), Belgium from March 22 to March 26, 2006. The city of Herentals is located in the geographic region of Campine, which is well known for cyclo-cross. The championship included 119 athletes (86 men, 33 women) and 54 officials from 17 countries. Athletes contested in a cyclo-cross race for men and four road cycling disciplines: a road race and an individual time trial for both men and women.

Participation
Each country was allowed to enter a maximum of twelve competitors: 4 men and women in the road race events and 4 men in the Cyclo-cross race.
A person was allowed to participate as a competitor if he/she was born between January 1, 1978, and December 31, 1988, and was a full-time student at a university or similar institute or had obtained their academic degree in the year preceding the event.

Road cycling
The road race events were held in Antwerp, Belgium.

Time Trial

The men’s and women’s time trials were held at March 23,  consisted of 4 laps of 6.8 km for men (27.2) and 2 laps (13.6 km) for women. The men’ s race included 27 cyclists and the women’ s race 23. Both men’s and women’s time trials were dominated by Dutch cyclists with Loes Gunnewijk winning women’s gold and Malaya van Ruitenbeek taking home the men’s gold medal. Women’s silver was won by Ellen van Dijk and bronze went to Germans Verena Jooss. Tobias Erler won the silver medal in the men’s event and the host country was represented with Michiel van Aelbroeck winning bronze.

Road race

The road race events took place at 25 May on the same left hand circuit as that of the time trial and consisted of 21 laps (142.8 km) for men and 13 laps (88.4 km) for women. The men’s race started at 2pm and included 71 cyclists. The women’s road race competed in a field of 33 athletes.

After winning silver in the time trial, the Dutch Ellen van Dijk won gold in the women's road race leaving the silver to Eva Lutz from Germany and the bronze to Ludivine Henrion from.
In the men’s road race the gold medal went to Yvo Kusters from the Netherlands leaving the silver for Belgian time trial bronze medallist Michiel van Aelbroeck and bronze to the Dutch Malaya van Ruitenbeek Time Trial gold medallist.

Cyclo cross
The men’s cyclo cross race was held in Herentals, Belgium at 26 May. Sebastian Hannover from Germany won the gold and the silver went to Axel Bult from the Netherlands. It was a tight race between Hannover and Bult with a little sprint at the end. Belgian Tom van den Bosch was in fourth position for most of the race, but with three laps to go he took advantage of a gap left by René Birkenfelt and raced past the German and never gave up that spot for the rest of the race.

Schedule
Wednesday 22 March 2006
 Opening ceremony

Thursday 23 March 2006
 Road cycling: women's time trial, 13.6 km
 Road cycling: men's time trial, 27.2 km

Friday 24 March 2006
 Cyclo-cross: Men's race

Saturday 25 March 2006
 Road cycling women's road race, 88.4 km
 14:00 - Road cycling: men's road race, 142.8 km

Events summary

Road Cycling

Cyclo-cross

Medal table

See also
 2006 World University Championships

References

External links
International University Sports Federation - Cycling

World University Cycling Championships
World Championships
World Championships
World Championships
International cycle races hosted by Belgium
Sports competitions in Antwerp
Cycling
2006 in cycle racing
March 2006 sports events in Europe
2000s in Antwerp